Silva is a village in Buenaventura Municipality, Valle del Cauca Department in Colombia.

Climate
Silva has a tropical rainforest climate (Af) with very heavy to extremely heavy rainfall year-round.

References

Populated places in the Valle del Cauca Department